Valeri Petrovich Frolov (born 16 August 1949) is a Russian professional football coach and a former player.

Career
Born in Yaroslavl, Frolov was a product of local side FC Shinnik Yaroslavl's youth academy. He played professionally for Shinnik for seven seasons, either side of a two-year spell at PFC CSKA Moscow, scoring 38 goals in 158 league matches with Shinnik.

References

External links
 

1949 births
Footballers from Yaroslavl
Living people
Soviet footballers
Association football forwards
FC Shinnik Yaroslavl players
PFC CSKA Moscow players
Russian football managers
FC Shinnik Yaroslavl managers
Russian Premier League managers